In Tibet, the Tibetan calendar lags approximately four to six weeks behind the solar calendar. For example, the Tibetan First Month usually falls in February, the Fifth Month usually falls in June or early July and the Eight Month usually falls in September.

List of traditional Tibetan festivals

Losar

The Tibetan calendar is a lunisolar calendar. Losar is celebrated on the first three days of the first lunar month.

Gallery

See also
List of festivals in Asia

References

 
Festivals
Tibetan Buddhist festivals
Festivals
Festivals
Festivals